Meadow Mills is an unincorporated community in Frederick County, Virginia, United States. Meadow Mills is located in southern Frederick County southwest of Middletown on Cedar Creek, hence its former eponymous name of Cedar Creek.

References

Unincorporated communities in Frederick County, Virginia
Unincorporated communities in Virginia